Jamie Harry (born July 13, 1994) is a Canadian football defensive back for the Edmonton Elks of the Canadian Football League (CFL).

University career
Harry played U Sports football for the Ottawa Gee-Gees from 2015 to 2018. He  had 98 solo tackles and 14 interceptions. He was also named a U Sports  First Team All-Canadian in 2017 and 2018.

Professional career

Toronto Argonauts
Harry was drafted 38th overall in the 2019 CFL Draft by the Toronto Argonauts and signed with the team on May 16, 2019. He attended training camp with the Argonauts in 2019, but was released with the final cuts on June 7, 2019.

BC Lions
On September 9, 2019, Harry signed a practice roster agreement with the BC Lions. He made his professional debut on October 18, 2019, against the Saskatchewan Roughriders, but reverted to the practice roster following the game. He re-signed with the Lions following the end of the season, but did not play in 2020 due to the cancellation of the 2020 CFL season.

In 2021, Harry played in 10 regular season games where he had six defensive tackles and two special teams tackles. To begin the 2022 season, he played in the team's first two regular season games, but was released on July 19, 2022.

Edmonton Elks
Harry signed with the Edmonton Elks on July 29, 2022. He was featured prominently on defence as he played in nine regular season games and had 18 defensive tackles. He re-signed with the Elks on January 17, 2023.

References

External links
Edmonton Elks bio

1994 births
Living people
BC Lions players
Canadian football defensive backs
Edmonton Elks players
Ottawa Gee-Gees football players
Players of Canadian football from Quebec
Canadian football people from Montreal
Toronto Argonauts players